This is a list of the Australian moth species of the family Ethmiidae. It also acts as an index to the species articles and forms part of the full List of moths of Australia.

The Australian fauna consists of fourteen species of the genus Ethmia, twelve of which are endemic.

Ethmia anthracopis (Meyrick, 1902)
Ethmia clytodoxa Turner, 1917
Ethmia eupostica Powell, 1985
Ethmia heliomela Lower, 1923
Ethmia hemadelpha (Lower, 1903)
Ethmia heptasema (Turner, 1898)
Ethmia nigroapicella (Saalmüller, 1880)
Ethmia postica (Zeller, 1877)
Ethmia praeclara Meyrick, 1910
Ethmia pseustis Turner, 1942
Ethmia sphaerosticha (Meyrick, 1887)
Ethmia sporadica Turner, 1942
Ethmia thoraea Meyrick, 1910
Ethmia virilisca Powell, 1985

External links 
Ethmiidae at Australian Faunal Directory
Ethmiidae at  lepidoptera.butterflyhouse

Australia
Ethmiinae